Arbus is a commune in the Pyrénées-Atlantiques department in the Nouvelle-Aquitaine region of southwestern France.

The inhabitants of the commune are known as Arbusiens or Arbusiennes

Geography

Arbus is located in the urban area of Pau 15 km to the north-west of the city and some 35 km south-east of Orthez mostly on the south bank of the Gave de Pau. Access to the commune is on the D2 road from Laroin in the south-east passing through the north of the commune to Abos in the north-west. Access to the village is by the D804 running off the D2 in the commune and continuing to Artiguelouve in the south-east and also by the D229 from the village to Parbayse in the south-west. The commune is mixed forest and farmland with large forests in the west, south, and south-east.

Located in the Drainage basin of the Adour, the Gave de Pau flows through the northern part of the commune with some of its tributaries flowing through the rest of the commune: the Juscle and Baise Lasseube, as well as their tributaries, the Sibé stream, and the old Canal du Moulin which is itself joined in the commune by the Arrious stream.

Historical places and hamlets

 Alicq
 Barraqué
 Barrère
 Bédat
 Bellocq
 Berduc
 Bert
 Biscar
 Bordes
 Candau
 Cap d'Arrandes
 Castaing
 Castéra
 Catroui
 Chigé
 Croutzé
 Fages
 Ferrou
 Gaurrat
 Laborde
 Labourdette
 Lacroix
 Lagré
 Lahitte
 Lalanne
 Laplace
 Larribot
 Larrieste
 Laugary
 Manciet
 Monget
 Mounes
 Parisot
 Pé de Lahore
 Peyrounet
 Pommé
 Priou
 Ramonteu
 Rauly
 Saint-Sorque
 Sarthou
 Serviau
 Sibé
 Sibers
 Tourangé
 Les Tourne-Brides
 Tuheil
 Vigneau

Neighbouring communes and villages

Toponymy
The commune name in béarnais is Arbús (according to the classical norm of Occitan). According to Michel Grosclaude, there is an aquitane root *arb-, meaning "grass" (close to alpe), and a collective suffix -untz giving a meaning of "a place where there is grass".

The following table details the origins of the commune name and other names in the commune.

Sources:
Raymond: Topographic Dictionary of the Department of Basses-Pyrenees, 1863, on the page numbers indicated in the table. 
Grosclaude: Toponymic Dictionary of communes, Béarn, 2006 
Cassini: Cassini Map from 1750

Origins:
Barcelona: Titles of Barcelona.
Orthez: Cartulary of Orthez. 
Census: Census of Béarn
Terrier: Terrier of Arbus.

History

Paul Raymond on page 5 of his 1863 dictionary noted that in 1385 Arbus had 40 fires and depended on the bailiwick of Pau. The town was a dependency of the Marquisate of Gassion.

Administration

List of Successive Mayors

Inter-communality
The commune of Arbus is part of eight inter-communal structures:
 the Communauté d'agglomération Pau Béarn Pyrénées;
 the SIVU for the management and development of the watercourses in the Baïses basin;
 the SIVU for aged and infirm services for the Canton of Lescar;
 the AEP association for Gave and Baïse;
 the association for the management of the banks of the Juscle and its tributaries;
 the association for sanitation of the communes in the valleys of the Juscle and the Baïse;
 the Energy association for Pyrénées-Atlantiques ;
 the inter-communal syndicate for defence against floods of the Gave de Pau.

Demography
In 2017 the commune had 1,205 inhabitants.

Economy
The commune is part of the Appellation d'origine contrôlée (AOC) zone of Winemakers of Jurançon and of Béarn and partially in the AOC zone for Ossau-iraty.

Culture and Heritage

Religious Heritage
The Parish Church of Saint-Mamer (1868) is registered as an historical monument.

Amenities

Education
The town has a primary school.

Notable people linked to the commune
Arnaud II of Arbus (or Arnaldus of Arbouze) from 1303 to 1320  was Bishop of Lescar.
Pommiès André, born in 1904 at Bordeaux and died in 1972 at Arbus was a French military Hero of the Resistance.
Georges Lapassade, born in 1924 at Arbus and died in 2008 at Stains, was a philosopher and French sociologist.

See also
Communes of the Pyrénées-Atlantiques department

References

External links
Arbus official website 
Community of communes of Miey de Béarn website Arbus page 
Arbus on Géoportail, National Geographic Institute (IGN) website 
Arbus on the 1750 Cassini Map

Communes of Pyrénées-Atlantiques